The 2021 North Carolina Education Lottery 200 was the 10th stock car race of the 2021 NASCAR Camping World Truck Series and the 19th iteration of the event. The race was held on Friday, May 28, 2021 in Concord, North Carolina at Charlotte Motor Speedway, a  permanent quad-oval. John Hunter Nemechek of Kyle Busch Motorsports would win his third race of the year and his 9th of his career. Carson Hocevar of Niece Motorsports and Ben Rhodes of ThorSport Racing would finish in the rest of the podium positions, taking 2nd and 3rd, respectfully. 

The race was marred by a late race crash including Trey Hutchens, Johnny Sauter, and Drew Dollar. Coming into Turn 3, Hutchens would blow a tire and was slow on the track- crucially, he could not get to pit road, and was stuck on the frontstretch, meaning he could not get to pit road for an extremely long time, or until the caution came out. Sauter and Dollar were in a battle for position coming off Turn 4 when Sauter, who could not see Hutchens, slammed the back side of Hutchens car with the right side of his, causing both cars to be destroyed in the incident. Dollar would also be involved, but was able to continue. The crash would lead to major controversy, with critics saying that NASCAR should have noticed Hutchens' car on track being slow, and that the caution should have been put out.

Background 

The race was held at Charlotte Motor Speedway, located in Concord, North Carolina. The speedway complex includes a 1.5-mile (2.4 km) quad-oval track that was utilized for the race, as well as a dragstrip and a dirt track. The speedway was built in 1959 by Bruton Smith and is considered the home track for NASCAR with many race teams based in the Charlotte metropolitan area. The track is owned and operated by Speedway Motorsports Inc. (SMI) with Marcus G. Smith serving as track president.

Entry list 

*Withdrew due to a private family matter.

**Withdrew due to sponsorship issues.

Practice 
The first and final practice would take place on May 28, 2021 at 12:34 PM EST.

The practice had numerous incidents occur, including incidents with Drew Dollar, Danny Bohn, Timothy Peters, C. J. McLaughlin, and Akinori Ogata.

Starting lineup 
Qualifying was to be originally held on Friday, May 28 after practice- however, rain would fall on the track, and qualifying was canceled. Therefore, NASCAR reverted to the metric system they had been using- a formula based on the previous race, this being the 2021 Toyota Tundra 225. As a result, Todd Gilliland of Front Row Motorsports would win the pole.

Race

Pre-race ceremonies

Race recap

Post-race driver comments 
Following the lap 116 wreck, Hutchens spoke to the media, looking visibly shakened. He would report that "I cut a tire getting into (Turn) 3 and tried to slow down to get to pit road and the hole closed up, so I ended up slow down the frontstretch and (Sauter) just ran into the back of us. …  They were coming pretty hard. They probably needed to throw the yellow a little sooner.”

Race results 
Stage 1 Laps: 30

Stage 2 Laps: 30

Stage 3 Laps: 74

References 

2021 NASCAR Camping World Truck Series
NASCAR races at Charlotte Motor Speedway
North Carolina Education Lottery 200
North Carolina Education Lottery 200